Adolfo Fernández Bustamante (1898–1957) was a Mexican screenwriter and film director.

Selected filmography
 The Coward (1939)
 El baisano Jalil (1942)
 The Two Orphans (1944)
 Autumn and Spring (1949)
 Paco the Elegant (1952)
 Hotel Room (1953)
 To the Four Winds (1955)

References

Bibliography 
 María Luisa Amador. Cartelera cinematográfica, 1950-1959. UNAM, 1985.

External links 
 

1898 births
1957 deaths
Mexican film directors
People from Veracruz
20th-century Mexican screenwriters
20th-century Mexican male writers